Events from 2021 in the European Union.

Incumbents 
 President of the European Council
 Charles Michel
 Commission President
 Ursula von der Leyen 
 Council Presidency
 Portugal (Jan – Jun 2021)
 Slovenia (July – Dec 2021)
 Parliament President
 David Sassoli
 High Representative
 Josep Borrell

Events

January 
 6 January – The European Medicines Agency approves the Moderna COVID-19 vaccine for use within the European Union.

March 
 3 March – Hungary's Fidesz party led by Prime Minister Viktor Orbán decided to leave the EPP Group, after the EPP Group's new rules.

April 
 1 April – The Polish Prime Minister Mateusz Morawiecki, and Italian former Minister of the Interior and leader of Northern League Matteo Salvini visit Hungary to meet with Hungarian Prime Minister: Viktor Orbán. It was wildly reported by the media they talked about forming a New Nationalist Conservative political group of the European Parliament to counter European People's Party group.

July 
 2 July –  The leaders of “right-wing parties” from 16 EU countries, signs in several European capitals a document calling for deep reform of the EU. The document  is signed  by Hungary's Viktor Orbán Fidesz, Poland's Jarosław Kaczyński Law and Justice, Finland's Finns Party, Italy's Brothers of Italy and Lega ,  Spain's VOX, France's Marine le Pen National Rally, Bulgaria's VMRO, Austria's Freedom Party of Austria (FPÖ), Belgium's (Vlaams Belang), Denmark's Danish People's Party, Estonia's EKRE, Greece's Greek Solution,  Netherlands(Ja21),  Lithuania (Lietuvos lenkų rinkimų akcija) and  Romania (Partidul Național Țărănesc Creștin Democrat.
 7 July — The start of the 2021–2022 Belarus–European Union border crisis begins. 
 14 July — The Polish Constitutional Tribunal rules that any interim measures from the top European court against Poland's judicial reforms were "not in line" with the Polish constitution. the Polish justice minister, Zbigniew Ziobro, said the constitutional court's decision was “against interference, usurpation and legal aggression by organs of the European Union”.

October
 October 7 — The Polish Constitutional Tribunal rules that some articles in EU treaties are “incompatible” with its national legislation and unconstitutional. it also ruled that Poland's constitution takes precedence over some EU laws.

December 
 24 December – Polish Leader Jarosław Kaczyński said Germany is trying to turn the EU into a federal “German Fourth Reich”.

See also

Country overviews
 European Union
 History of European Union
 Outline of European Union
 Politics of European Union
 Timeline of European Union history
 Years in European Union
 History of modern European Union 
 Government of European Union

Related timelines for current period
 2021
 2021 in politics and government
 2020s

References 

 
Years of the 21st century in the European Union
2020s in the European Union